Clubview is a small residential suburb in Centurion, Gauteng, South Africa.

References

Suburbs of Centurion, Gauteng